The Late Music Volume One is an album by The Olivia Tremor Control side project Black Swan Network.  Released on Camera Obscura, it is a collection of tracks inspired by Olivia Tremor Control fans who wrote the band with descriptions of dreams they had.

Track listing
 "One" – 4:21
 "Two" – 5:47
 "Three" – 2:31
 "Four" – 4:26
 "Five" – 16:34
 "Six" – 17:43
 "Seven" – 9:36

References

Black Swan Network albums
1997 albums